Oberwart Gunners, for sponsorship reasons known as Unger Steel Gunners Oberwart, is a professional basketball club based in Oberwart, Austria. The team plays in the Österreichische Basketball Bundesliga and was founded in 1957. The team has won the Austrian championship two times, in 2011 and 2016.

Trophies
Österreichische Basketball Bundesliga
Winners (2): 2011, 2016
Runner-up (6): 1997, 1998, 2005, 2007, 2008, 2013
Austrian Cups
Winners (5): 1995, 1999, 2005, 2016, 2021

Sponsorship names
Due to sponsorship reasons, the club has been known as:
Macabido Gunners (2004–2007)
Redwell Oberwart Gunners (2012–2017)
Unger Steel Oberwart Gunners (2018-present)

Season by season

Players

Notable players

References

External links
 Eurobasket.com Oberwart Gunners Page

Basketball teams in Austria
Basketball teams established in 1957
1957 establishments in Austria
Sport in Burgenland